Wüst (or Wuest) is a surname that may refer to

 Craig Wuest, American keyboardist
 Georg Wüst (1890-1977), German oceanographer
 Hendrik Wüst (b. 1975), German politician
 Ireen Wüst (b. 1986), Dutch long track allround speed skater
 Josef Wüst (1925-2003), Austrian journalist, editor-in-chief and publisher
 Kenneth Wuest (1893-1962), New Testament Greek scholar
 Marcel Wüst (b. 1967), German road bicycle racer
 Markus Wüst (b. 1971), Swiss Nordic combined skier
 Ryan Wuest, (b. 1981), South African football player
 Walther Wüst (1901-1993), German Orientalist, President of the SS Ahnenerbe Research Institute 
German toponymic surnames